Decent Parties is a 2009 Malayalam-language film by Abraham Lincoln starring Jagadish.

Plot 
Sudheendran is a photographer and runs Padma Studio, a photo studio. His friend Rafeeque, a film production executive, helps him get a chance in films as an assistant cameraman and they discover that Sudheendran also has a talent for script-writing.

Sudheendran gets himself into trouble when his staff Sasi, who is in charge of the photo studio in his absence, mixes a girl's photo with that of another stranger for an advertisement. This creates big issues for the girl, named Sreeja and her marriage, which was fixed earlier, was called off. To resolve this issue, Sudheendran decides to marry Sreeja. Sreeja is a much more practical-minded person while Sudheendran is still amidst his dreams. The film follows how they sort out their differences and end up in a decent life.

Cast 
 Jagadish as Sudheendran
 Meera Vasudevan as Sreeja
 Jagathy Sreekumar as Porinju
 Salim Kumar as Rafeeq
 Sai Kumar as Film Producer
 Vijayaraghavan
 Mukesh
 Bijukuttan
 Tony
 Urmila Unni
 Zeenath

References

External links 
 Decent Parties at IndiaGlitz
 Decent Parties at Oneindia.in

2009 films
2000s Malayalam-language films